Old Main and Chemistry Building are two, connected, historic buildings built in 1867 and 1883 located on the campus of Widener University in Chester, Pennsylvania.

Description
The Old Main building is four-stories high with stucco and Wissahickon schist stone exterior.  It has a two-pitched roof with a central grand pediment and two minor flanking pediments.  Atop the grand pediment is a unique "dome" structure and atop both minor pediments are matching cupola.

The measurements of the building are 243 feet (east to west) by 65 feet (East end) and 55 feet (West end) with walls that are 2 1/2 feet thick.  The discrepancy in the measurements is due to renovations in 1883 after a fire destroyed the upper floors on the eastern end.  The symmetry of the building was lost with the eastern addition of an auditorium, classrooms and dormitory space.

The Chemistry Building is adjacent to Old Main and is a three-story building measuring 37 feet by 51 feet.  It is connected to Old Main by a wrought iron and plank-board walk-way extending from the 2nd floor of each structure.  It was built in order to separate dangerous laboratory conditions from the dormitory area of the Old Main building.

History
The Old Main building was built in 1867 and the Chemistry building in 1883.  Old Main served as the primary quarters for the Pennsylvania Military Academy and Pennsylvania Military College from 1867 to 1957.  After expansion of the school and construction of additional facilities, Old Main was used as the center of administrative services for the College.

Both buildings were listed on the National Register of Historic Places in 1978.

References

University and college buildings on the National Register of Historic Places in Pennsylvania
Buildings and structures in Delaware County, Pennsylvania
Chester, Pennsylvania
National Register of Historic Places in Delaware County, Pennsylvania
University and college administration buildings in the United States